The Super Rapid Train, often known as SRT, is a high-speed rail service operated by SR Corporation. The service starts at Suseo station in southeast Seoul and terminates at either Busan station or Mokpo station.

Around 86% of the train service runs 50 meters underground between Suseo and Cheonan-Asan stations. Dongtan station, the first station after departing from Suseo, is the first underground high-speed railway station in Korea. The SRT runs the Seoul–Busan route 8 minutes faster than KTX as it travel exclusively on dedicated Suseo–Pyeongtaek, Gyeongbu and Honam HSR lines. The Suseo-Pyeongtaek HSR line was built exclusively for this service.

Branding 
Before official announcement by SR, Ministry of Land, Infrastructure and Transport used tentative term called Suseo High-speed Railway (수서고속철도).

On October 12, 2015, SR proposed three candidate name for new high-speed rail service – SRT (Super Rapid Train), HSR (High-speed train of SR), SRH (SR High-speed train) in which SRT (Super Rapid Train) was chosen.

Route
Legend

Suseo–Busan

Suseo–Mokpo

Rolling stock

KTX-Sancheon

The train service is operated using 22 KTX-Sancheon Class 120000 train sets and 10 KTX-Sancheon Class 130000 train sets. Class 120000 train sets was originally operated by Korail's KTX service before it was transferred to SR at the end of 2016, while Class 130000 train sets are new builds.

Demand for extension
Since Super Rapid Train only has two routes, there are many local cities that only KTX serves. In November 2016, Jeonju and Yeosu urged the SR Corporation to run trains on the Jeolla Line. In December 2016, the mayor of Pohang proposed running SRT service to Pohang station using the Donghae Line In January 2021, the mayor of Changwon urged the SR Corporation to run SRT service to Changwon station using the Gyeongjeon Line.

See also
KTX
High-speed rail in South Korea

References

External links
 

Super Rapid Train
High-speed rail in South Korea